Laser 3.14 is the pseudonym of an anonymous graffiti artist, painter and poet in Amsterdam, who started writing graffiti in the early 1980s at the age of about eleven.

Career
The poet behind the pseudonym Laser 3.14 sprays short socially critical street poems on fences and construction sites, especially in Amsterdam. His pseudonym is a reference to his love of science fiction. 3.14 here stands for Pi, which is also an abbreviation for 'Public Image'. His English poetic spells have not gone unnoticed and he has given interviews to various media. In addition to his graffiti activities, Laser 3.14 is an exhibiting artist and cartoonist. In April 2009 he published his book Are You Reading Me? 

In 2018 Laser 3.14 was a guest speaker at the TED conference TEDxAmsterdam.

Bibliography

References

External links 
 Website Laser 3.14

Graffiti and unauthorised signage